Foymount is a community situated in the township of Bonnechere Valley, Ontario, Canada, located on the 512 and Opeongo Road in Renfrew County, west of Eganville. Foymount is approximately 125 kilometres (80 mi) due west of Ottawa.

The community was named for John Foy, postmaster.

Foymount and the surrounding area is a popular destination for backpackers and hikers, and was the location of warranty and repair facilities for camping equipment manufacturer Sierra Designs. However, the outlet closed on August 26, 2010.

The location is also popular for amateur astronomers given the high altitude and low levels of artificial light.

Canadian military history 

Because of the high altitude, the Royal Canadian Air Force built a radar base on the site in the 1950s as part of the Pinetree Radar Line, established for the detection of nuclear bombers coming over the polar region from the Soviet Union. Canadian Forces Station (CFS) Foymount was closed in 1974 because more powerful radar installations that overlapped Foymount's coverage area were built at Canadian Forces Station (CFS) Falconbridge in Ontario and CFS Lac St. Denis in Quebec. The site is now split up into private property with high surveillance and entrance is prohibited. Doing so is a criminal offense.

Telecommunications and broadcasting 

The high-altitude site is also popular for the purpose of radio and television transmission.  The Canadian Broadcasting Corporation operated a rebroadcast transmitter (CBOT-TV-1) at the site until 2012.  In 2006 the Canadian Radio-television and Telecommunications Commission rejected an application for United Christian Broadcasters Canada to begin operating a rebroadcast transmitter on the site.

UHF/VHF repeaters:
 FOYMOUNT Call: VE3UCR; Input: 144.830; Output: 145.430; Linked to VE3NRR, Pembroke by DTMF code.

See also 

 Foymount Farm

External links 
 Foymount at The Atlas of Canada - Topographic Maps
 Foymount at maps.google.com

References 

 http://www.pinecone.on.ca/MAGAZINE/stories/foymount.html
 http://ca.epodunk.com/profiles/ontario/foymount/2003994.html
 http://www.valleyexplore.com/drive/opeongoline.htm
 http://www.pinetreeline.org/other/other16/other16b.html
 http://www.crtc.gc.ca/archive/ENG/Decisions/2006/db2006-547.htm
 http://www.ncf.ca/ip/sigs/media.sigs/amradio/rptrs/rptrs.ont
 http://strategis.ic.gc.ca/app/ccc/srch/nvgt.do?lang=eng&prtl=1&estblmntNo=123456079107&profile=cmpltPrfl&app=1

Communities in Renfrew County
Ghost towns in Ontario